V-type proton ATPase 21 kDa proteolipid subunit is an enzyme that in humans is encoded by the ATP6V0B gene.

This gene encodes a component of vacuolar ATPase (V-ATPase), a multisubunit enzyme that mediates acidification of eukaryotic intracellular organelles. V-ATPase dependent organelle acidification is necessary for such intracellular processes as protein sorting, zymogen activation, receptor-mediated endocytosis, and synaptic vesicle proton gradient generation. V-ATPase is composed of a cytosolic V1 domain and a transmembrane V0 domain. The V1 domain consists of three A and three B subunits, two G subunits, plus the C, D, E, F, and H subunits. The V1 domain contains the ATP catalytic site. The V0 domain consists of five different subunits: a, c, c', c'', and d.

Additional isoforms of many of the V1 and V0 subunit proteins are encoded by multiple genes, or alternatively spliced transcript variants. This encoded protein is part of the transmembrane V0 domain, and is the human counterpart of yeast VMA16. Two alternatively spliced transcript variants that encode different proteins have been found for this gene.

References

External links

Further reading